John Curr Anderson (8 May 1915 – February 1987) was a Scottish professional footballer, who played as a centre forward. The summit of his career was scoring one of the goals for Portsmouth in their 4–1 win over Wolverhampton Wanderers in the 1939 FA Cup Final.

He was the second John Anderson to play for Portsmouth, the first having joined the club in 1903.

Honours
Portsmouth
FA Cup: 1939

References

1915 births
1987 deaths
Aldershot F.C. players
Association football forwards
Footballers from Dundee
Portsmouth F.C. players
Scottish footballers
English Football League players
Date of death missing
FA Cup Final players